Selyshche is a village in western Ukraine, in Dnistrovskyi Raion of Chernivtsi Oblast. It belongs to Sokyriany urban hromada, one of the hromadas of Ukraine.

The population is 1560 persons (based on 2001 census).

Until 18 July 2020, Selyshche belonged to Sokyriany Raion. The raion was abolished in July 2020 as part of the administrative reform of Ukraine, which reduced the number of raions of Chernivtsi Oblast to three. The area of Sokyriany Raion was merged into Dnistrovskyi Raion.

References

Villages in Dnistrovskyi Raion
Khotinsky Uyezd